Mashabei Sadeh is a kibbutz in southern Israel. Located in the Negev desert, it falls under the jurisdiction of Ramat HaNegev Regional Council.

History
The kibbutz was established in 1947 in the Halutza dunes, and was originally known as Mashabim (Hebrew: משאבים, lit. Resources). During the 1948 Arab-Israeli War the kibbutz was attacked by the Egyptian army, but was retained by Israel. After the war ended it relocated to its present site. It was renamed Mashabei Sadeh in honour of Palmach leader Yitzhak Sadeh who died in 1952.

Economy
Apart from agriculture (field crops, poultry and dairy), the kibbutz breeds shrimp using special  aquaculture techniques. It is also the only kibbutz in Israel to breed the Australian fish Barramundi. It also operates a factory, Sagiv, that produces brass ball-valves and fittings, and runs a guesthouse.

References

External links
Official website

Kibbutzim
Kibbutz Movement
Populated places established in 1947
1947 establishments in Mandatory Palestine
Populated places in Southern District (Israel)